Sir Richard Everard Nichols (26 April 1938 – 13 March 2016) was an English solicitor and the 670th Lord Mayor of London.

Nichols was born in Watford, Hertfordshire, the son of Guy Everard Nichols and Patricia Mary Hurst. His father, clerk of the Salters' Company, died when he was 7 years old. With the assistance of the Salters' Company Richard was educated at Christ's Hospital School, Horsham, Sussex. He served in the Royal Engineers, 1956–58.

He joined a Watford-based firm of solicitors, becoming a senior partner in 1976. He joined the Salters' Company and became Master of the company for 1988–99.

Encouraged by the Company he became a Common Councilman on the City of London council in 1983 and an Alderman in 1984. He was elected Sheriff of London for 1994–95 and Lord Mayor of London for 1997–98. He was knighted on 4 November 1998.

He served as Chancellor of the University of Ulster from 2002 to 2010.

He married Shelagh Loveband and had two sons and a daughter. Around 1990 he jointly with others bought a 300-acre (120 Ha) farm in Kings Langley, Hertfordshire on which the family lived.

References

1938 births
2016 deaths
People from Watford
People educated at Christ's Hospital
British solicitors
Sheriffs of the City of London
20th-century lord mayors of London
20th-century English politicians
Knights Bachelor
Chancellors of Ulster University